Azhoor  is a town and suburb of Thiruvananthapuram metropolitan area of Thiruvananthapuram district in the state of Kerala, India.

Demographics
 India census, Azhoor had a population of 28831 with 13176 males and 15655 females.

References

Villages in Thiruvananthapuram district